This Time Around is the fourth studio album by Canadian country music singer Paul Brandt, released on Orange Music Canada, a subsidiary of Universal Music Group, in 2004. The record features a guest appearance by Keith Urban, who plays guitar on "Leavin'." This song was later released by Blaine Larsen in 2010. The album also features a remake of the C. W. McCall song "Convoy". It was recorded at The Orchard Studio near Nashville, TN and produced by Steve Rosen and Paul Brandt.

Track listing
All songs written by Paul Brandt except where noted.
 "Convoy (C.W. McCall cover)" (Chip Davis, Bill Fries) – 4:32
 "Leavin'" – 5:07
 "Home" – 4:11
 "Alberta Bound" – 3:47
 "Run to Me" (Brandt, Deric Ruttan) – 4:38
 "The King" – 3:54
 "Live Now" – 4:03
 "Rich Man" (Brandt, Brad Johner) – 3:34
 "I Still Do" (Brandt, Steve Rosen, Jason Blaine) – 4:32
 "This Time Around" – 3:36
 "That's What I Love About Jesus" – 5:50
 "Hope" – 4:23 (Hidden Track)

References

Paul Brandt albums
2004 albums
Canadian Country Music Association Album of the Year albums